Anacamptis israelitica is a species of orchid found in Israel.

References 

israelitica
Plants described in 1997
Endemic flora of Israel